Kat and the Kings is a South African musical with a book and lyrics by David Kramer and music by Taliep Petersen.

Set in late-1950s South Africa, it focuses on teenager Kat Diamond, who believes he's the best singer and dancer in District Six, a multi-racial slum in Cape Town. With his friends Ballie, Magoo, Bingo, and Lucy, he forms the a cappella group the Cavalla Kings, and the quintet - emulating the American doo wop and rock and roll they adore - becomes a sensation, graduating from street corners to "whites only" nightclubs (where the dictates of apartheid force them to use the rear entrance) and a recording contract.

The show was inspired by the memories of Salie Daniels, the real-life Kat who appeared as the narrator in the original production. After touring South Africa, the show was invited to the Tricycle Theatre in Kilburn in November 1997, and returned to that venue prior to its opening in the West End.  Directed by Kramer and choreographed by Loukmaan Adams and Jody Abrahams, it opened on March 23, 1998 at the Vaudeville Theatre, where it ran for slightly more than four months. In addition to Daniels, the cast included Abrahams as the young Kat, Adams as Bingo, Junaid Booysen as Ballie, Alistair Izobel as Magoo, and Mandisa Bardill as Lucy.
   
Kat and the Kings won the Laurence Olivier Award for Best New Musical and, in an unusual move, the entire cast was named Best Actor in a Musical. The show also was nominated for Best Theatre Choreography. An original cast album was recorded live during the June 6, 1998 performance and released by First Night Records.

After fifteen previews, the Broadway production opened on August 19, 1999 at the Cort Theatre, where it ran for 157 performances. Terry Hector and Kim Louis replaced Daniels as the elder Kat and Mandisa Bardill as Lucy, respectively, but the remainder of the cast and the director and choreographers were from the London production. It was nominated for Drama Desk Awards for Outstanding Featured Actor in a Musical (Alistair Izobell), Outstanding Choreography, and Outstanding Orchestrations.

Song list

Act I      
 Memory
 American Thing
 Lucky Day
 Mavis
 Boetie Guitar
 Cavalla Kings
 If Your Shoes Don't Shine
 Dress to Kill
 Shine
 The Tafelberg Hotel
 Lonely Girl
 Josephine
 Wild Time

Act II      
 Happy to Be Nineteen
 Lonely Girl (Reprise)
 Oo Wee Bay Bee
 Only If You Have a Dream
 The Last Thing You Need
 Stupid Boy
 Cavalla Kings (Reprise)
 The Singing Sensation
 The Bell Hop
 Blind Date
 Lonely Girl (Reprise)
 The Invisible Dog
 Hey Baby

 
 Cavalla Kings (Reprise)
 Skeleton Dance
 Lagunya
 Lucky Day (Reprise)
 The Singing Sensation (Reprise)
 Hey Baby (Reprise)
 We Were Rocking
 Lagunya (Reprise)
 Wild Time (Reprise)

References

External links
 Internet Broadway Database listing

1997 musicals
West End musicals
Broadway musicals
Laurence Olivier Award-winning musicals
South African musicals